Protocyon is an extinct genus of large canid endemic to South and North America during the Late Pleistocene living from 781 to 12thousand years ago.

Description
Protocyon was a hypercarnivore, suggested by its dental adaptations. Like many other large canids, it was most likely a pack hunter. It hunted the medium-sized grazers and browsers, and bite marks on fossils suggest that it may have hunted Glyptotherium. , modest in size compared to other canids including the dire wolf, despite its modest size isotopic analysis shows a dietary overlap with Smilodon populator, which implies it actively hunted much larger prey animals since S. populator weighed at least 400kg.

Taxonomy
Protocyon was named by Giebel in 1855 and assigned to Canidae by Carroll in 1988. A member of the Cerdocyonina lineage, its closest living relative might be the bush dog.

Fossil distribution
Fossils of Protocyon have been found in the Ñuapua and Tarija Formations of Bolivia, the Vorohue Formation of Buenos Aires, Argentina, Santa Elena Peninsula of Ecuador, Sopas Formation of Uruguay, Mene de Inciarte Tar Seep of Venezuela and various sites in Brazil, among others the Jandaíra Formation.

References

Cerdocyonina
Prehistoric canines
Prehistoric carnivoran genera
Pleistocene carnivorans
Pleistocene mammals of South America
Pleistocene mammals of North America
Lujanian
Pleistocene Argentina
Fossils of Argentina
Pleistocene Bolivia
Fossils of Bolivia
Pleistocene Brazil
Fossils of Brazil
Pleistocene Ecuador
Fossils of Ecuador
Pleistocene Mexico
Fossils of Mexico
Pleistocene Uruguay
Fossils of Uruguay
Pleistocene Venezuela
Fossils of Venezuela
Fossil taxa described in 1855